Cyprinion is a genus of ray-finned fish in the family Cyprinidae.

Species
 Cyprinion acinaces Banister & M. A. Clarke, 1977
 Cyprinion acinaces acinaces Banister & M. A. Clarke, 1977
 Cyprinion acinaces hijazi Krupp, 1983 (Note:  possibly synonym of C. a. acinaces)
 Cyprinion kais Heckel, 1843
 Cyprinion macrostomum Heckel, 1843
 Cyprinion mhalensis Alkahem & Behnke, 1983
 Cyprinion microphthalmum (F. Day, 1880)
 Cyprinion milesi (F. Day, 1880)
 Cyprinion semiplotum (McClelland, 1839) (Assamese kingfish)
 Cyprinion tenuiradius Heckel, 1847
 Cyprinion watsoni (F. Day, 1872)

References

 
Cyprinidae genera